Stephen Eugene Sesnick Jr. (September 8, 1941 – October 27, 2022) was an American rock club and rock band manager, and later an inventor and businessman.

Early life
Sesnick was born in Hoboken, New Jersey, on September 8, 1941. He was educated at St. Cecilia High School in Englewood, New Jersey and he went on to play freshman basketball for St. John's University in New York City.

Velvet Underground manager
Sesnick was manager of the Boston Tea Party, a seminal Boston nightclub founded in 1967, which was the first in Boston to spearhead the burgeoning psychedelic rock and underground rock scene, and which also helped break bands which went on to become major stars. Sesnick was replaced in 1968 by Don Law.

The Velvet Underground shows at the Tea Party were particularly notable and the band became especially popular in Boston. Sesnick also knew the band from his involvement with Andy Warhol's Exploding Plastic Inevitable. After the Velvet Underground ended their association with Warhol and Paul Morrissey in 1967, they selected Sesnick to be their manager. Sesnick was also associated with Jonathan Richman at the start of his career.

Over the next few years, Sesnick influenced the Velvet Underground to move toward a more commercial direction in their music.. Doug Yule was invited to join the Velvet Underground when John Cale quit. Lou Reed later accused Sesnick of driving "a wedge between" him and Yule during the recording of Loaded in 1970, and Yule did aver that Sesnick favored him as the potential leader for a new Velvet Underground, minimizing Reed's role.

Sesnick owned the tapes that were to become 1969: The Velvet Underground Live. Sterling Morrison and Maureen Tucker signed over their rights to the tapes for $1,500 each ($ in  dollars).

Businessman
By 1972, what was left of the Velvet Underground ceased operations, and Sesnick left the music business and became an avid golfer. He says he conceived the concept of the Skins Game, a yearly golf event where four top golfers competed head-to-head in a match play format. Extant from 1983 to 2008, according to Sesnick he came up with the idea, convinced some influential people of the worth of the concept, and began working on the project with the sports marketing company People & Properties. People & Properties then obtained buy-in from Arnold Palmer; this attracted wider attention, and bigger industry players stepped in and seized control of (and credit for) the property from Sesnick, he has said. (Others have disputed this account.)

After this, Sesnick worked in golf as a consultant with organizations including Golf 20/20, First Tee, and TourTurf.

Sesnick was later part of a team at Florida Sustainables which developed technology for replacing plastic grocery bags and other plastic items with robust but degradable plastics, the research being partly funded by a $383,000 grant from the American National Science Foundation ($ in  dollars). This effort won the team the 2011 Cade Prize from the Cade Museum for Creativity and Invention.

Sesnick claimed to have invented improvements to the solar cell and licensed it for commercial development from the University of Florida through Sestar Technologies, a sort of parent company for Florida Sustainables, of which Sesnick was a co-founder and Vice President of Product Development.

Personal life and death
Sesnick died due to complications from a heart attack in St. Augustine, Florida, on October 27, 2022. He was 81. He was survived by his wife Cynthia.

References

1941 births
2022 deaths
People from Hoboken, New Jersey
The Velvet Underground
Talent managers
American music managers
21st-century American businesspeople
St. Cecilia High School (New Jersey) alumni
St. John's University (New York City) alumni